The 2008–09 Virginia Tech Hokies men's basketball team competed in the Atlantic Coast Conference.

Coaching staff

Roster 

Starters are indicated in bold

Schedule and results

References 

Virginia Tech Hokies men's basketball seasons
Virginia Tech
Virginia Tech
Virginia Tech
Virginia Tech